The Hybrid Instruments Committee is a select committee of the House of Lords in the Parliament of the United Kingdom. The role of the committee is to look into all opposed hybrid instruments (i.e., a statutory instrument that, but for its enabling act, would have had to proceed through Parliament as a hybrid bill or private bill), and to advise the House as to whether it should appoint a select committee, similar to those appointed for opposed private bills, to scrutinise the instrument and the petition or petitions against it.

Membership
The current membership of the committee is as follows:

Lord Swinfen ( Conservative) was also a committee member until his death in June 2022.

See also
List of Committees of the United Kingdom Parliament

External links
 Hybrid Instruments Committee, UK Parliament

Committees of the House of Lords